The 2005 Libyan SuperCup took place between 2004-05 Libyan Premier League champions Al Ittihad and 2004-05 Libyan Cup runners-up Al Akhdar (as Al Ittihad had already won the Libyan Cup, Al Akhdar took their place in the final as runners-up). The match finished 1-0 to Al Ittihad. This was their 5th consecutive victory in the 9th edition of the Super Cup

Match details

Libyan Super Cup
Super Cup